ZGS Communications, also referred to as the ZGS Group or ZGS Broadcasting, was a television and radio station operator in the United States, based in Arlington, Virginia. The company operated 11 stations: 10 television stations and one radio station. All of their television stations and one radio station broadcast in Spanish.

On December 4, 2017, NBCUniversal's Telemundo Station Group announced its purchase of ZGS' 10 television stations.
The sale was completed in early 2018. Two of the stations (WRIW-CD and WZGS-CD) were filed separately, as ZGS were negotiating channel sharing agreements at the time of the sale. Those sales were completed in July 2018.

Effective April 10, 2018, ZGS sold their sole radio station to Alejandro Carrasco's ACR Media, Inc.

Former ZGS stations

Television stations 

1 Owned by NBCUniversal (owner of Telemundo), ZGS operated and managed the stations.

Radio stations

References

Defunct broadcasting companies of the United States
Mass media companies disestablished in 2018